The 2010 Stanjames.com World Matchplay was the 17th annual staging of the World Matchplay, organised by the Professional Darts Corporation. The tournament took place from 17–25 July 2010.

Phil Taylor successfully defended his title, defeating Raymond van Barneveld in the final to win his eleventh World Matchplay. Van Barneveld also hit only the second ever nine-dart finish at the World Matchplay in his first round victory over Denis Ovens.

3D
The semi-finals and final of the World Matchplay were shown in 3D for the first time ever in darts. Over 1,000 venues in the UK broadcast the matches in 3D via Sky Sports. Commentator Sid Waddell was quoted as saying: "It's a revolution in darts TV broadcasting".

Prize money
For the second consecutive World Matchplay, the prize fund was £400,000.

Qualification
The qualification is the top 16 in the PDC Order of Merit qualify automatically and a further 16 have to qualify for the tournament by being in the top 16 of the Players Championships order of merit.

The participants are:

PDC Top 16
  Phil Taylor (winner)
  Raymond van Barneveld (runner-up)
  James Wade (semi-finals)
  Mervyn King (first round)
  Terry Jenkins (first round)
  Ronnie Baxter (second round)
  Adrian Lewis (first round)
  Mark Walsh (second round)
  Colin Lloyd (first round)
  Andy Hamilton (first round)
  Colin Osborne (first round)
  Simon Whitlock (semi-finals)
  Robert Thornton (first round)
  Dennis Priestley (first round)
  Alan Tabern (second round)
  Paul Nicholson (first round)

PDPA Players Championship qualifiers
  Vincent van der Voort (second round)
  Andy Smith (first round)
  Wayne Jones (quarter-finals)
  Jamie Caven (first round)
  Co Stompé (quarter-finals)
  Mark Webster (second round)
  Wes Newton (first round)
  Denis Ovens (first round)
  Gary Anderson (second round)
  Jelle Klaasen (quarter-finals)
  Tony Eccles (first round)
  Steve Brown (second round)
  Kevin Painter (quarter-finals)
  Mark Dudbridge (first round)
  Steve Beaton (second round)
  Barrie Bates (first round)

Draw

Statistics

References

External links 
 World Matchplay at dartsdatabase.com
 World Matchplay at PDC.tv

World Matchplay (darts)
World Matchplay Darts
World Matchplay Darts